Li Yanmei (born February 6, 1990, in Chaozhou) is a Chinese triple jumper. She placed 30th overall in the women's triple jump event at the 2012 Summer Olympics with a jump of 13.43 metres.

International competitions

References

1990 births
Living people
Chinese female triple jumpers
People from Chaozhou
Athletes from Guangdong
Olympic athletes of China
Athletes (track and field) at the 2012 Summer Olympics
Athletes (track and field) at the 2014 Asian Games
World Athletics Championships athletes for China
Asian Games competitors for China